KPTN-LD (channel 7) is a low-power television station in St. Louis, Missouri, United States. It is owned by Innovate Corp. alongside Telemundo affiliate WODK-LD (channel 45) and Buzzr affiliate KBGU-LD (channel 33). KPTN-LD's transmitter is located near Shrewsbury, Missouri.

History

From 1991 to 2001, the station was an affiliate of The Box music channel. KPTN later picked up the Home Shopping Network in 2003.

The station began broadcasting HSN on LD1 infrequently in June 2011. In November 2011, Sonlife began broadcasting on LD2. TheCoolTV returned to St. Louis on LD3 in late December 2012 (until 2013). LD4 has a title card announcing P-TV coming soon as of late December 2012. The station appeared to go silent in late December 2011. As of at least June 24, 2012, it was back on the air, with programming as noted above. In May 2015, three more subchannels were added, however, while LD7 was displaying as OnTV4U, the programming was actually being broadcast on LD4, which was displaying as LIQUID, while LD7 was broadcasting a test pattern.

In June 2013, KPTN-LD was slated to be sold to Landover 5 LLC as part of a larger deal involving 51 other low-power television stations; the sale fell through in June 2016. Mako Communications sold its stations, including KPTN-LD, to HC2 Holdings in 2017.

Subchannels
The station's digital signal is multiplexed:

References

Television stations in St. Louis
Television channels and stations established in 1991
Low-power television stations in the United States
1991 establishments in Missouri
Innovate Corp.